Chelis is a genus of tiger moths in the family Erebidae. There are more than 30 described species in Chelis, found in the holarctic.

As a result of phylogenetic research published in 2016, the genera Holoarctia, Neoarctia, Hyperborea have been merged with Chelis, and their species are now members of the genus Chelis.

Species
These species belong to the genus Chelis:

 Chelis ammosovi (Dubatolov & Gurko, 2002)
 Chelis arragonensis (Staudinger, 1894)
 Chelis beanii (Neumögen, 1891) (Bean's tiger)
 Chelis brucei (Edwards, 1888)
 Chelis buraetica (Bang-Haas, 1927)
 Chelis caecilia (Kindermann, 1853)
 Chelis cantabrica 
 Chelis cecilia (Kindermann, 1853)
 Chelis cervini (Fallou, 1864)
 Chelis czekanowskii (Grum-Grshimailo, 1899)
 Chelis dahurica (Boisduval, 1832)
 Chelis erschoffii (Alpheraky, 1882)
 Chelis ferghana (Staudinger, 1887)
 Chelis glaphyra (Eversmann, 1843)
 Chelis golbecki (Dubatolov, 1996)
 Chelis gracilis (Dubatolov, 1996)
 Chelis gratiosa (Grum-Grshimailo, 1890)
 Chelis hauensteini (Kautt, 1996)
 Chelis kashmirica (Ferguson, 1985)
 Chelis kindermanni (Staudinger, 1867)
 Chelis lafontainei (Ferguson, 1985)
 Chelis maculosa (Gerning, 1780)
 Chelis marxi (O. Bang-Haas, 1927)
 Chelis mira (Dubatolov & Tshistjakov, 1989)
 Chelis mongolica (Alpheraky, 1888)
 Chelis mustangbhoti (Daniel, 1961)
 Chelis pardalina (Pungeler, 1898)
 Chelis puengeleri (Bang-Haas, 1927)
 Chelis rasa (Saldaitis, Ivinskis & Churkin, 2000)
 Chelis reticulata (Christoph, 1887)
 Chelis simplonica (Boisduval, 1840)
 Chelis sordida (McDunnough, 1921)
 Chelis strigulosa (Böttcher, 1905)
 Chelis turkestana (Dubatolov, 1996)
 Chelis variabilis (Daniel, 1966)
 Chelis wagneri (Püngeler, 1918)

References

Further reading

 
 , 1988: A species review of the genus Chelis Rbr. (Lepidoptera, Arctiidae) from the fauna of the U.S.S.R. In: Taxonomy of animals of Siberia: 80-98, Nauka, Siberian Department: Novosibirsk. (Series “New and little known species of Siberian fauna”, No 20) (in Russian).
Natural History Museum Lepidoptera generic names catalog

Arctiina
Moth genera